The NASA Trilogy consists of three hard science fiction novels written by British science fiction author Stephen Baxter. They were published from 1996 to 1998. These books explore the possibilities of the American space program if the circumstances had been different. They have generally darker tones than his other books and are critical of NASA. They consist of:

External links
The Space Review: Space alternate history before For All Mankind: Stephen Baxter’s NASA trilogy

References

Book series introduced in 1996
Stephen Baxter series
Hard science fiction
Novels about NASA